American Made is the eighth country studio album by The Oak Ridge Boys, released in 1983. It featured yet another "crossover hit" with the song "American Made", which hit #1 on the country charts (on April 23, 1983) and #72 on the U.S. Hot 100 singles chart.

Track listing

Personnel
As listed in Liner notes

The Oak Ridge Boys
Duane Allen
Joe Bonsall
William Lee Golden
Richard Sterban

Musicians
Barry Beckett - keyboards
Mickey Buckins - percussion
Jimmy Capps - acoustic guitar
Gene Chrisman - drums, percussion
Lloyd Green - steel guitar
Roger Hawkins - drums
David Hood - bass guitar
Jimmy Johnson - electric guitar
Kenneth Lovelace - fiddle
Steve Nathan - keyboards, synthesizer
Ron Oates - keyboards
Wayne Perkins - electric guitar, acoustic guitar
Billy Sanford - electric guitar, mandolin
Bobby Thompson - banjo
Jack Williams - bass guitar
Chip Young - acoustic guitar
Reggie Young - electric guitar
The Nashville Hornworks - horns

Production
Produced By Ron Chancey
Engineer & Mixing: Les Ladd
Assistant Engineers: Ken Corlew, Ken Criblez, Tim Farmer, Pete Greene, Russ Martin, David McKinley, Mary Beth McLemore

Chart performance

Album

Singles

References

The Oak Ridge Boys albums
1983 albums
MCA Records albums
Albums produced by Ron Chancey